In Euclidean geometry, equipollence is a binary relation between directed line segments. Two parallel line segments are equipollent when they have the same length and direction.

Parallelogram property

A definitive feature of Euclidean space is the parallelogram property of vectors:
If two  segments are equipollent, then they form two sides of a parallelogram:

History
The concept of equipollent line segments was advanced by Giusto Bellavitis in 1835. Subsequently the term vector was adopted for a class of equipollent line segments. Bellavitis's use of the idea of a relation to compare different but similar objects has become a common mathematical technique, particularly in the use of equivalence relations. Bellavitis used a special notation for the equipollence of segments AB and CD: 

The following passages, translated by Michael J. Crowe, show the anticipation that Bellavitis had of vector concepts:
Equipollences continue to hold when one substitutes for the lines in them, other lines which are respectively equipollent to them, however they may be situated in space. From this it can be understood how any number and any kind of lines may be summed, and that in whatever order these lines are taken, the same equipollent-sum will be obtained...

In equipollences, just as in equations, a line may be transferred from one side to the other, provided that the sign is changed...
Thus oppositely directed segments are negatives of each other: 

The equipollence  where n stands for a positive number, indicates that AB is both parallel to and has the same direction as CD, and that their lengths have the relation expressed by AB = n.CD.

The segment from A to B is a bound vector, while the class of segments equipollent to it is a free vector, in the parlance of Euclidean vectors.

Extension
Geometric equipollence is also used on the sphere:
To appreciate Hamilton's method, let us first recall the much simpler case of the Abelian group of translations in Euclidean three-dimensional space. Each translation is representable as a vector in space, only the direction and magnitude being significant, and the location irrelevant. The composition of two translations is given by the head-to-tail parallelogram rule of vector addition; and taking the inverse amounts to reversing direction. In Hamilton's theory of turns, we have a generalization of such a picture from the Abelian translation group to the non-Abelian SU(2). Instead of vectors in space, we deal with directed great circle arcs, of length < π on a unit sphere S2 in a Euclidean three-dimensional space. Two such arcs are deemed equivalent if by sliding one along its great circle it can be made to coincide with the other.
On a great circle of a sphere, two directed circular arcs are equipollent when they agree in direction and arc length. An equivalence class of such arcs is associated with a quaternion versor
 where a is arc length and r determines the plane of the great circle by perpendicularity.

References

 Giusto Bellavitis (1835) "Saggio di applicazioni di un nuovo metodo di Geometria Analitica (Calcolo delle equipollenze)", Annali delle Scienze del Regno Lombardo-Veneto, Padova 5: 244–59.
 Giusto Bellavitis (1854) Sposizione del Metodo della Equipollenze, link from Google Books.
 Charles-Ange Laisant (1874): French translation with additions of Bellavitis (1854) Exposition de la méthode des equipollences, link from Google Books.
 Giusto Bellavitis (1858) Calcolo dei Quaternioni di W.R. Hamilton e sua Relazione col Metodo delle Equipollenze, link from HathiTrust.
 Charles-Ange Laisant (1887) Theorie et Applications des Equipollence, Gauthier-Villars, link from University of Michigan Historical Math Collection.
 Lena L. Severance (1930) The Theory of Equipollences; Method of Analytical Geometry of Sig. Bellavitis, link from HathiTrust.

External links
 Axiomatic definition of equipollence

Vectors (mathematics and physics)
History of mathematics
Binary relations
Equivalence (mathematics)